Many private individuals in Great Britain own collections of narrow-gauge railway equipment or operate short railways. These railways are generally not open to the public, but often contain historically significant rolling stock or other items.

Private collections

Private railways

References

See also 
 British narrow-gauge railways

 Private